All India Tanzeem Ulama-e-Islam (AITUI), also known as  Tanzeem Ulama-e-Islam is an organisation of Bareilvi-Sunni Muslims.  In 2019 an article in the Times of India via the Times News Network feed claimed AITUI was the predominant Sunni organization in the country.

Activities 
Maulana Shahabuddin Razvi General secretary of Tanzeem said A fatwa for boycotting Chinese products., On the occasion of 103 Urse Razvi, while issuing the "Muslim Agenda" in the press conference, has instructed Muslims to pay attention to education, business, and family and stop the evils spreading in the society, otherwise there will be big losses in the future. Shahbuddin said in a statement issued to the press that if Shahrukh Khan had taught his son Aryan in a madrasa, he would not have seen this day.

History
AITUI was established by Maulana Ashfaq Hussain Qadri in Delhi.  The general secretary is Maulana Sahabuddin Razvi.

Events

Conference against terrorism 2016
At a conference in the Talkatora Stadium, New Delhi culminated in the issuing of a fatwa against terrorism, with concerns expressed over activities of Wahabis

International Ghareeb Nawaz World Peace Conference 2019
A key conference organised by AITUI was the International Ghareeb Nawaz World Peace Conference on 24 February 2019 at the Ramlila Maidan ground in New Delhi.  According to the Spokesperson of AITUI, Shujaat Ali Quadri In the Event a fatwa was issued against the terrorism by the prominent Mufti and Ulema.

See also
 All India Ulema and Mashaikh Board, (AIUMB)

References

 
 
 
 
 
 

Sufi organizations
Sunni organizations
Islamic organisations based in India
Sunni Islam in India